The Landesliga Steiermark is the football division of the Austrian state of Styria. It is the fourth highest soccer league in Austria.

Mode
The divisions championship is made up of 16 teams. The championship is held in a home round and away round, both with 15 match days. The games are determined through a random draw prior to the start of the first round. The championship season consists of 30 game days.

After finishing the championship, the first placed team (champion) is entitled to promotion to the third-class Austrian Regional League Central. At the end of the championship season, as many lower ranking teams leave the Landesliga division that with regard to Styrian teams leaving the Austrian Regional League Central and Styrian top ranking teams moving up from the Oberliga divisions there are 16 teams in the Landesliga Steiermark. The number of teams that move from the Landesliga Steiermark to the Styrian Oberliga divisions varies because of this to three and four teams.

2022–23 member clubs 
SC Bruck/Mur 
SV Frauental 
UFC Fehring
SC Raika Fürstenfeld
FC Union Gamlitz
SV Gnas
TuS Heiligenkreuz
Ilzer SV
FC Judenburg
ASK Köflach
SV Lafninitz II
SV Lebring
SC Liezen
USV Mettersdorf
ASK Voitsberg
SV Wildon

References

Football competitions in Austria
Football in Austria